The Tsushima salamander (Hynobius tsuensis) is a species of salamander in the family Hynobiidae, endemic to Japan. Its natural habitats are temperate forests and rivers.

References

Hynobius
Amphibians described in 1922
Endemic amphibians of Japan
Taxonomy articles created by Polbot
Taxobox binomials not recognized by IUCN